In graph theory, an eternal dominating set for a graph G = (V, E) is a subset D of V such that D is a dominating set on which mobile guards are initially located (at most one guard may be located on any vertex). The set D must be such that for any infinite sequence of attacks occurring sequentially at vertices, the set D can be modified by moving a guard from an adjacent vertex to the attacked vertex, provided the attacked vertex has no guard on it at the time it is attacked. The configuration of guards after each attack must induce a dominating set. The eternal domination number, γ∞(G),  is the minimum number of vertices possible in the initial set D. For example, the eternal domination number of the cycle on five vertices is two.

The eternal dominating set problem, also known as the eternal domination problem and the eternal security problem, can also be interpreted as a combinatorial game played between two players that alternate turns: a defender, who chooses the initial dominating set D and the guard to send to each attack that occurs at a vertex without a guard; and an attacker, who chooses the vertex to be attacked on their turn. The attacker wins the game if they can ever choose a vertex to be attacked such that there is no guard on that vertex or a neighboring vertex; the defender wins otherwise. In other words, the attacker wins the game if they can ever attack a vertex such that the attack cannot be defended.

History

Subsequent to the  paper, a number of papers by other authors appeared in the mathematical literature. In these subsequent papers, several additional variations on the eternal domination problem were proposed including the eternal vertex cover problem, the eternal independent set problem, eternal total dominating sets, eternal connected dominating sets, and eternal dominating sets in the eviction model (the latter model requires that when attacks occur a vertex with a guard and the guard must move to a neighboring vertex that contains no guard, if one exists).

Bounds

Let G be a graph with n ≥ 1 vertices. Trivially, the eternal domination number is at least the domination number γ(G). In their paper, Goddard, Hedetniemi, and Hedetniemi proved the eternal domination number is at least the independence number of G and at most the clique covering number of G (the clique covering number of G is equal to the chromatic number of the complement of G). Therefore, the eternal domination number of G is equal to the clique covering number of G for all perfect graphs, due to the perfect graph theorem. It has been shown that the eternal domination number of G is equal to the clique covering number of G for several other classes of graph, such as circular-arc graphs (as proven in ) and series-parallel graphs (as proven in ). Goddard, Hedetniemi, and Hedetniemi also demonstrated a graph in which the eternal domination number of the graph is less than the clique covering number.

It was proven by  that the eternal domination number of a graph with independence number α is a most α(α + 1)/2.  proved that there are infinitely many graphs where the eternal domination number is exactly α(α + 1)/2.

Bounds on the m-eternal domination number

Goddard, Hedetniemi, and Hedetniemi proved the m-eternal domination number, denoted γm∞(G), is at most the independence number of G. Hence, the eternal domination parameters fit nicely into the famous domination chain of parameters, see , as follows:
 γ(G) ≤ γm∞(G) ≤ α(G) ≤ γ∞(G) ≤ θ(G)
where θ(G) denotes the clique-covering number of G and γ∞(G) denotes the eternal domination number.

The m-eternal domination number in grid graphs was first studied in  where it was shown that
 γm∞ = ⌈2n/3⌉ for the 2 by n grid with n ≥ 2 
and
 γm∞ ≤ ⌈8n/9⌉ for 3 by n grids. 
 1 + ⌈4n/5⌉ ≤ γm∞ ≤ 2 + ⌈4n/5⌉
when n ≥ 11.
 γm∞ = ⌈(4n+7)/5⌉ for n ≥ 22. 

Open questions

Similar to Vizing's conjecture for dominating sets, it is not known whether for all graphs G and H

 

Namely,  whether γ∞(G) equals the clique covering number for all planar graphs G and whether γ∞(G) can bounded below by the Lovász number, also known as the Lovász theta function.
  
A number of other open questions are stated in the survey paper , including many questions on the variations of eternal dominating sets mentioned above.

References

.
.
.
.
.
.
.
.
.
 
.
.
.
.
.
.
.
.
.
.
.
.
.

Graph theory objects